The Peacock Chair (Danish: Påfuglestolen) is a chair designed by Hans J. Wegner in 1947. It was originally produced by Johannes Hansen but its currently produced by PP Møbler under the model number PP550.

As it was characteristic of Wegner's furniture, the Peacock Chair borrows from the design of the traditional English Windsor chair. To add an element of design and to make the chair more ergonomic for the user's shoulders, Wegner chose to flatten the fan of spindles. When fellow designer Finn Juhl first saw the chair's characteristic flat spindle backrest, he was reminded of a peacock’s tail and christened it the Peacock Chair.

Wegner also experimented with an upholstered version of the chair and displayed it at the 1953 Cabinetmakers’ Guild Exhibition. It was never put into mass production in Wegner's lifetime and only a handful were produced by Johannes Hansen. PP Møbler re-released the chair in 2014 to mark the anniversary of Wegner's 100th birthday. In 2018, Philips auctioned an early version of the upholstered chair with selling price of $68,750.

Gallery

References

Further reading

 Design classic: the Peacock chair by Hans Wegner
 Video on how the chair is made (Danish language with English subtitles)

1947 in art
Hans Wegner furniture
Danish modern
Chairs
Individual models of furniture
Products introduced in 1947